Riccio may refer to:
Aloisio Riccio, bishop
Andrea Riccio, Italian sculptor
Antonello Riccio, Italian painter
Bill Riccio, American activist
Dan Riccio, American businessman
Daniele Riccio, Italian engineer
Dennis Riccio, American NFL footballer
Eros Riccio, Italian chess player
Felice Riccio, Italian painter
Giovanni Battista Riccio, Italian musician
Luigi Riccio
Mariano Riccio, Italian painter
Michel Riccio, lawyer
Paolo Riccio, German philosopher
Suzanne Riccio-Major, boxer
Thomas Riccio (disambiguation), multiple people